Palola is a genus of polychaetes belonging to the family Eunicidae.

The genus has almost cosmopolitan distribution, except northernward regions.

Species:

Palola accrescens 
Palola brasiliensis 
Palola ebranchiata 
Palola edentulum 
Palola esbelta 
Palola leucodon 
Palola madeirensis 
Palola pallidus 
Palola paloloides 
Palola siciliensis 
Palola simplex 
Palola valida 
Palola vernalis 
Palola viridis

References

Annelids
Polychaetes